Lakshmi (sometimes spelled Laxmi), also known as Shri, is one of the principal goddesses in Hinduism. She is the goddess of wealth, fortune, power, beauty, fertility and prosperity, and associated with Maya ("Illusion"). Along with Parvati and Saraswati, she forms the Tridevi of Hindu goddesses.

Within the goddess-oriented Shaktism, Lakshmi is venerated as the prosperity aspect of the Mother goddess. Lakshmi is both the consort and the divine energy (shakti) of the Hindu god Vishnu, the Supreme Being of Vaishnavism; she is also the Supreme Goddess in the sect and assists Vishnu to create, protect, and transform the universe. She is an especially prominent figure in Sri Vaishnavism, in which devotion to Lakshmi is deemed to be crucial to reach Vishnu. Whenever Vishnu descended on the earth as an avatar, Lakshmi accompanied him as consort, for example, as Sita and Radha or Rukmini as consorts of Vishnu's avatars Rama and Krishna, respectively. The eight prominent manifestations of Lakshmi, the Ashtalakshmi, symbolise the eight sources of wealth.

Lakshmi is depicted in Indian art as an elegantly dressed, prosperity-showering golden-coloured woman standing or sitting in the padmasana position upon a lotus throne, while holding a lotus in her hand, symbolising fortune, self-knowledge, and spiritual liberation. Her iconography shows her with four hands, which represent the four aspects of human life important to Hindu culture: dharma, kāma, artha, and moksha. The Lakshmi Sahasranama of the Skanda Purana, Lakshmi Tantra, Markandeya Purana, Devi Mahatmya, and Vedic scriptures describe Lakshmi as having eight or eighteen hands, and as sitting on Garuda, a lion, or a tiger. According to the Lakshmi Tantra, the goddess Lakshmi, in her ultimate form of Mahasri, has four arms of a golden complexion, and holds a citron, a club, a shield, and a vessel containing amrita. In the Skanda Purana and the Venkatachala Mahatmayam, Sri, or Lakshmi, is praised as the mother of Brahma.

Archaeological discoveries and ancient coins suggest the recognition and reverence for Lakshmi existing by the 1st millennium BCE. Lakshmi's iconography and statues have also been found in Hindu temples throughout Southeast Asia, estimated to be from the second half of the 1st millennium CE. The day of Lakshmi Puja during Navaratri, and the festivals of Deepavali and Sharad Purnima (Kojagiri Purnima) are celebrated in her honour.

Etymology and epithets

Lakshmi in Sanskrit is derived from the root word lakṣ and lakṣa, meaning 'to perceive, observe, know, understand' and 'goal, aim, objective', respectively. These roots give Lakshmi the symbolism: know and understand your goal. A related term is lakṣaṇa, which means 'sign, target, aim, symbol, attribute, quality, lucky mark, auspicious opportunity'.

Lakshmi has numerous epithets and numerous ancient Stotram and Sutras of Hinduism recite her various names: such as Sri (Radiance, eminence, splendor, wealth),  Padmā (she who is mounted upon or dwelling in a lotus or She of the lotus),  Kamalā or Kamalatmika (She of the lotus), Padmapriyā (Lotus-lover), Padmamālādhāra Devī (Goddess bearing a garland of lotuses),  Padmamukhī (Lotus-faced-she whose face is as like as a lotus),  Padmākṣī: (Lotus-eyed - she whose eyes are as beautiful as a lotus), Padmahasta: (Lotus-hand - she whose hand is holding [a] lotus[es]),  Padmasundarī (She who is as beautiful as a lotus), Padmavati (She who was born from a lotus), Śrījā (Jatika of Sri), Narayani (belonging to Narayana or the wife of Narayana), Vaishnavi (worshipper of Vishnu or the power of Vishnu),  Viṣṇupriyā (who is the beloved of Vishnu), Nandika (the one who gives pleasure). Vaishnavas also consider Lalita, who is praised with 1,000 names in the Lalita Sahasranama, as Lakshmi.

Lakshmi Sahasranama of Skanda Purana praises Lakshmi as Mahadevi (she who is the great goddess), Mahamaya (she who is a great illusion), Karaveera Nivasini (The Goddess Who lives in Karaveera/Kolhapur) and Maha Astha Dasa Pithagne (she who has 18 great Shakti Peethas). She is also praised as Mahalakshmi (she who is great Lakshmi), Mahakali (she who is great Kali) and Mahasaraswati (she who is great Saraswati) who are the primary deities in Devi Mahatmya. The other prominent names included in this text are, Bhuvaneshvari (she who is the Queen or ruler of the Universe), Katyayani (she who is the daughter of sage Katyayana), Kaushiki (Shakti that came out of the sheath (or Kosha) of Parvati), Brahmani (She who is the power of Brahma), Kamakshi (she who fulfils desires by her eyes), Chandi (she who killed Mahishasura), Chamunda (She who killed Chanda and Munda), Madhu Kaidabha Bhanjini (she who killed Madhu and Kaidabha), Durga (she who killed Durgamasura), Maheshvari (she who is the power of Maheshvara), Varahi (she who is the power of Varaha, a form of Vishnu), Narasimhi (she who is the power of Narasimha, a form of Vishnu), Srividyaa (she who is Sri Vidya), Sri Manthra Raja Rajini (the queen of Sri Vidya), Shadadharadhi devata (she who is the goddess of the six chakras). Dutch author Dirk van der Plas says, "In Lakshmi Tantra, a text of Visnuite signature, the name Mahamaya is connected with third or destructive of Goddess' three partial functions, while in supreme form she is identified with Lakshmi".

Her other names include: Aishwarya, Akhila, Anagha, Anapagamini, Anumati, Apara, Aruna, Atibha, Avashya, Bala, Bhargavi, Bhudevi, Chakrika, Chanchala, Chandravadana, Chandrasahodari, Chandraroopa, Devi, Deepta, Haripriya, Harini, Harivallabha, Hemamalini, Hiranyavarna, Indira, Jalaja, Jambhavati, Janaki, Janamodini, Jyoti, Jyotsna, Kalyani, Kamalika, Ketaki, Kriyalakshmi, Kshirsha, Kuhu, Lalima, Madhavi, Madhu, Malti, Manushri, Nandika, Nandini, Nikhila, Nila Devi, Nimeshika, Parama, Prachi, Purnima, Radha, Ramaa, Rukmini, Samruddhi, Samudra Tanaya, Satyabhama, Shraddha, Shreeya, Sita, Smriti, Sridevi, Sudha, Sujata, Swarna Kamala, Taruni, Tilottama, Tulasi, Vasuda, Vasudhara, Vasundhara, Varada, Varalakshmi, Vedavati, Vidya, Vimala, and Viroopa.

Symbolism and iconography

Lakshmi is a member of the Tridevi, the triad of great goddesses. She represents the Rajas guna, and the Iccha-shakti.
The image, icons, and sculptures of Lakshmi are represented with symbolism. Her name is derived from Sanskrit root words for knowing the goal and understanding the objective. Her four arms are symbolic of the four goals of humanity that are considered good in Hinduism: dharma (pursuit of ethical, moral life), artha (pursuit of wealth, means of life), kama (pursuit of love, emotional fulfillment), and moksha (pursuit of self-knowledge, liberation).

In Lakshmi's iconography, she is either sitting or standing on a lotus and typically carrying a lotus in one or two hands. The lotus carries symbolic meanings in Hinduism and other Indian traditions. It symbolizes knowledge, self-realization, and liberation in the Vedic context, and represents reality, consciousness, and karma ('work, deed') in the Tantra (Sahasrara) context. The lotus, a flower that blooms in clean or dirty water, also symbolizes purity regardless of the good or bad circumstances in which it grows. It is a reminder that good and prosperity can bloom and not be affected by evil in one's surroundings.

Lakshmi Sahasranama of Skanda Purana, Lakshmi Tantra, Markandeya Purana, Devi Mahatmya and Vedic scriptures describes Lakshmi as having eighteen hands and is described as holding rosary, axe, mace, arrow, thunderbolt, lotus, pitcher, rod, sakti, sword, shield, conch, bell, wine-cup, trident, noose and the discus in her eighteen hands.

Below, behind, or on the sides, Lakshmi is very often shown with one or two elephants, known as Gajalakshmi, and occasionally with an owl. Elephants symbolize work, activity, and strength, as well as water, rain and fertility for abundant prosperity. The owl signifies the patient striving to observe, see, and discover knowledge, particularly when surrounded by darkness. As a bird reputedly blinded by daylight, the owl also serves as a symbolic reminder to refrain from blindness and greed after knowledge and wealth have been acquired. According to historian D. D. Kosambi, most of the Imperial Gupta kings were Vaishnavas and held the goddess Lakshmi in the highest esteem. Goddess Lakshmi is Simhavahini (mount as lion) on most of the coins during their rule. Coins during the rule of Prakashadiya, a Gupta ruler, contain the Garudadhvaja on the obverse and Lakshmi on the reverse. The Gupta period sculpture only used to associate lions with Lakshmi but was later attributed to Durga or a combined form of both goddesses. Lions are also associated with Veera Lakshmi, who is one of the Ashtalakshmi. Historian B. C. Bhattacharya says, "An image of Gajalakshmi is found with two lions — one on either side of her. Two elephants are also shown near her head and by this we can say that Lion is also the vahana of Lakshmi along with Garuda".

In some representations, wealth either symbolically pours out from one of her hands or she simply holds a jar of money. This symbolism has a dual meaning: wealth manifested through Lakshmi means both materials as well as spiritual wealth. Her face and open hands are in a mudra that signifies compassion, giving or dāna ('charity').

Lakshmi typically wears a red dress embroidered with golden threads, which symbolizes fortune and wealth. She, goddess of wealth and prosperity, is often represented with her husband Vishnu, the god who maintains human life filled with justice and peace. This symbolism implies wealth and prosperity are coupled with the maintenance of life, justice, and peace.

In Japan, where Lakshmi is known as Kisshōten, she is commonly depicted with the Nyoihōju gem (如意宝珠) in her hand.

Literature

Vedas and Brahmanas
The meaning and significance of Lakshmi evolved in ancient Sanskrit texts. Lakshmi is mentioned once in Rigveda, in which the name is used to mean 'kindred mark, sign of auspicious fortune'.

In Atharva Veda, transcribed about 1000 BCE, Lakshmi evolves into a complex concept with plural manifestations. Book 7, Chapter 115 of Atharva Veda describes the plurality, asserting that a hundred Lakshmis are born with the body of a mortal at birth, some good, Punya ('virtuous') and auspicious, while others bad, paapi ('evil') and unfortunate. The good are welcomed, while the bad urged to leave. The concept and spirit of Lakshmi and her association with fortune and the good is significant enough that Atharva Veda mentions it in multiple books: for example, in Book 12, Chapter 5 as Punya Lakshmi. In some chapters of Atharva Veda, Lakshmi connotes the good, an auspicious sign, good luck, good fortune, prosperity, success, and happiness.

For example, in Shatapatha Brahmana, variously estimated to be composed between 800 BCE and 300 BCE, Sri (Lakshmi) is part of one of many theories, in ancient India, about the creation of the universe. In Book 9 of Shatapatha Brahmana, Sri emerges from Prajapati, after his intense meditation on the creation of life and nature of the universe. Sri is described as a resplendent and trembling woman at her birth with immense energy and powers. The gods are bewitched, desire her, and immediately become covetous of her. The gods approach Prajapati and request permission to kill her and then take her powers, talents, and gifts. Prajapati refuses, tells the gods that men should not kill women and that they can seek her gifts without violence. The gods then approach Lakshmi. Agni gets food, Soma gets kingly authority, Varuna gets imperial authority, Mitra acquires martial energy, Indra gets force, Brihaspati gets priestly authority, Savitri acquires dominion, Pushan gets splendour, Saraswati takes nourishment and Tvashtri gets forms. The hymns of Shatapatha Brahmana thus describe Sri as a goddess born with and personifying a diverse range of talents and powers.

Epics
In the Epics of Hinduism, such as in Mahabharata, Lakshmi personifies wealth, riches, happiness, loveliness, grace, charm, and splendor. She appeared with a lotus in her hand and so she is also called Padmā.

Sita, the female protagonist of the Ramayana and her husband, the god-king Rama are considered as avatars of Lakshmi and Vishnu, respectively. In the Mahabharata, Draupadi is described as a partial incarnation of Sri (Lakshmi).
However, other chapter of the epic states that Lakshmi took the incarnation of Rukmini, the chief-wife of the Hindu god Krishna.

Upanishads
Shakta Upanishads are dedicated to the Tridevi of goddesses—Lakshmi, Saraswati and Parvati. Saubhagyalakshmi Upanishad describes the qualities, characteristics, and powers of Lakshmi. In the second part of the Upanishad, the emphasis shifts to the use of yoga and transcendence from material craving to achieve spiritual knowledge and self-realization, the true wealth. Saubhagya-Lakshmi Upanishad synonymously uses Sri to describe Lakshmi.

Stotram and sutras
Numerous ancient Stotram and Sutras of Hinduism recite hymns dedicated to Lakshmi. She is a major goddess in Puranas and Itihasa of Hinduism. In ancient scriptures of India, all women are declared to be embodiments of Lakshmi. For example:

Ancient prayers dedicated to Lakshmi seek both material and spiritual wealth in prayers.

Puranas
Lakshmi features prominently in Puranas of Hinduism. Vishnu Purana, in particular, dedicates many sections to her and also refers to her as Sri. J. A. B. van Buitenen translates passages describing Lakshmi in Vishnu Purana:Sri, loyal to Vishnu, is the mother of the world. Vishnu is the meaning, Sri is the speech. She is the conduct, he the behavior. Vishnu is knowledge, she the insight. He is dharma, she the virtuous action. She is the earth, the earth's upholder. She is contentment, he the satisfaction. She wishes, he is the desire. Sri is the sky, Vishnu the Self of everything. He is the Sun, she the light of the Sun. He is the ocean, she is the shore.

Subhasita, Genomic and Didactic Literature

Lakshmi, along with Parvati and Saraswati, is a subject of extensive Subhashita, genomic and didactic literature of India. Composed in the 1st millennium BCE through the 16th century CE, they are short poems, proverbs, couplets, or aphorisms in Sanskrit written in a precise meter. They sometimes take the form of a dialogue between Lakshmi and Vishnu or highlight the spiritual message in Vedas and ethical maxims from Hindu Epics through Lakshmi. An example Subhashita is Puranartha Samgraha, compiled by Vekataraya in South India, where Lakshmi and Vishnu discuss niti ('right, moral conduct') and rajaniti ('statesmanship' or 'right governance')—covering in 30 chapters and ethical and moral questions about personal, social and political life.

Manifestations and aspects

Inside temples, Lakshmi is often shown together with Vishnu. In certain parts of India, Lakshmi plays a special role as the mediator between her husband Vishnu and his worldly devotees. When asking Vishnu for grace or forgiveness, the devotees often approach him through the intermediary presence of Lakshmi. She is also the personification of spiritual fulfillment. Lakshmi embodies the spiritual world, also known as Vaikuntha, the abode of Lakshmi and Vishnu (collectively called Lakshmi Narayana). Lakshmi is the embodiment of the creative energy of Vishnu, and primordial Prakriti who creates the universe.

According to Garuda Purana, Lakshmi is considered as Prakriti (Mahalakshmi) and is identified with three forms  Sri, Bhu and Durga. The three forms consists of Satva ('goodness'), rajas, and tamas ('darkness') gunas, and assists Vishnu (Purusha) in creation, preservation and destruction of the entire universe. Durga form represents the power to fight, conquer and punish the demons and anti-gods.
 
In the Lakshmi Tantra and Lakshmi Sahasranama of Skanda Purana, Lakshmi is given the status of the primordial goddess. According to these texts, Durga and the forms such Mahalakshmi, Mahakali and Mahasaraswati and all the Shaktis that came out of all gods such as Matrikas and Mahavidya are all various forms of Goddess Lakshmi. In Lakshmi Tantra, Lakshmi says to Indra that she got the name Durga after killing an asura named Durgama. Indologists and authors Chitralekha Singh and Prem Nath says, "Narada Purana describes the powerful forms of Lakshmi as Durga, Mahakali, Bhadrakali, Chandi, Maheshwari, Mahalakshmi, Vaishnavi and Andreye".

Lakshmi, Saraswati, and Parvati are typically conceptualized as distinct in most of India, but in states such as West Bengal and Odisha, they are regionally believed to be forms of Durga. In Hindu Bengali culture, Lakshmi, along with Saraswati, are seen as the daughters of Durga. They are worshipped during Durga Puja.

In South India, Lakshmi is seen in two forms, Sridevi and Bhudevi, both at the sides of Venkateshwara, a form of Vishnu. Bhudevi is the representation and totality of the material world or energy, called the Apara Prakriti, or Mother Earth; Sridevi is the spiritual world or energy called the Prakriti. According to Lakshmi Tantra, Nila Devi, one of the manifestations or incarnations of Lakshmi is the third wife of Vishnu. Each goddess of the triad is mentioned in Śrī Sūkta, Bhu Sūkta and Nila Sūkta, respectively. This threefold goddess can be found, for example, in Sri Bhu Neela Sahita Temple near Dwaraka Tirumala, Andhra Pradesh, and in Adinath Swami Temple in Tamil Nadu. In many parts of the region, Andal is considered as an incarnation of Lakshmi.

Ashta Lakshmi is a group of eight secondary manifestations of Lakshmi. The Ashta Lakshmi presides over eight sources of wealth and thus represents the eight powers of Shri Lakshmi. Temples dedicated to Ashta Lakshmi are found in Tamil Nadu, such as Ashtalakshmi Kovil near Chennai and many other states of India.

Creation and legends

Devas (gods) and asuras (demons) were both mortal at one time in Hinduism. Amrita, the divine nectar that grants immortality, could only be obtained by churning Kshira Sagara ('Ocean of Milk'). The devas and asuras both sought immortality and decided to churn the Kshira Sagara with Mount Mandhara. The Samudra Manthana commenced with the devas on one side and the asuras on the other. Vishnu incarnated as Kurma, the tortoise, and a mountain was placed on the tortoise as a churning pole. Vasuki, the great venom-spewing serpent-god, was wrapped around the mountain and used to churn the ocean. A host of divine celestial objects came up during the churning. Along with them emerged the goddess Lakshmi. In some versions, she is said to be the daughter of the sea god since she emerged from the sea.

In Garuda Purana, Linga Purana and Padma Purana, Lakshmi is said to have been born as the daughter of the divine sage Bhrigu and his wife Khyati and was named Bhargavi. According to Vishnu Purana, the universe was created when the devas and asuras churned the cosmic Kshira Sagara. Lakshmi came out of the ocean bearing lotus, along with divine cow Kamadhenu, Varuni, Parijat tree, Apsaras, Chandra (the moon), and Dhanvantari with Amrita ('nectar of immortality'). When she appeared, she had a choice to go to Devas or Asuras. She chose Devas' side and among thirty deities, she chose to be with Vishnu. Thereafter, in all three worlds, the lotus-bearing goddess was celebrated.

Worship
Many Hindus worship Lakshmi on Deepavali (Diwali), the festival of lights. It is celebrated in autumn, typically October or November every year. The festival spiritually signifies the victory of light over darkness, knowledge over ignorance, good over evil and hope over despair.

Before Deepavali night, people clean, renovate and decorate their homes and offices. On Deepavali night, Hindus dress up in new clothes or their best outfits, light up diyas (lamps and candles) inside and outside their home, and participate in family puja (prayers) typically to Lakshmi. After the Lakshmi Puja, fireworks follow, then a family feast including mithai (sweets), and an exchange of gifts between family members and close friends. Deepavali also marks a major shopping period, since Lakshmi connotes auspiciousness, wealth and prosperity. This festival dedicated to Lakshmi is considered by Hindus to be one of the most important and joyous festivals of the year.

A very sacred day for the worship of Goddess Lakshmi falls on Chaitra Shukla Panchami, also called, Lakshmi Panchami, Shri Panchami, Kalpadi and Shri Vrata. As this worship is in the first week of the Hindu new year, by Hindu calendar, it is considered very auspicious. Varalakshmi Vratam is celebrated by married Hindu women to pray for the well-being of their husbands.

Gaja Lakshmi Puja is another autumn festival celebrated on Sharad Purnima in many parts of India on the full-moon day in the month of Ashvin (October). Sharad Purnima, also called Kojaagari Purnima or Kuanr Purnima, is a harvest festival marking the end of monsoon season. There is a traditional celebration of the moon called the Kaumudi celebration, Kaumudi meaning moonlight. On Sharad Purnima night, goddess Lakshmi is thanked and worshipped for the harvests. Vaibhav Lakshmi Vrata is observed on Friday for prosperity.

Temples 

]

Some significant temples dedicated to Goddess Lakshmi are:
 108 Divya Desams
 Lakshmi Narasimha Temple, Nuggehalli
 Laxminarayan Temple, Delhi
 Lakshminarayana Temple, Hosaholalu
 Mahalakshmi Temple, Kolhapur
 Mahalakshmi Temple, Dahanu
 Mahalakshmi Temple, Mumbai
 Mookambika Temple, Kollur
 Lakshmi Devi Temple, Doddagaddavalli
 Chottanikkara Temple, Kerala
 Sri Kanaka Maha Lakshmi Temple, Andhra Pradesh 
 Bhagyalakshmi Temple, Hyderabad
 Golden Temple, Sripuram
 Ashtalakshmi Temple, Chennai
 Thirunarayur Nambi Temple
 Azhagiya Manavala Perumal Temple
 Agroha Dham
 Narasimhaswamy Temple, Namakkal [As Nammagiri Thayar]
 Nachiyar Koil [As Vanchulavalli thayar]
 Mahalakshmi Temple Kallur [Second Kolhapur] 
 Goravanahalli Mahalakshmi Temple
 Sri Lakshmi Kuberar Temple,Rathinamangalam
 Mahalaksmi temple Bandora , Panaji
 Mahalakshmi temple Ucchila
 Mahalakshmi Mandir, Pune 
 Kanakadhara Mahalakshmi Temple,Punnorkode, Pazhamthottam
 Pundarikakshan Perumal Temple 
 Narasimhaswamy Temple, Namakkal 
 Lakshmi Temple, Khajuraho
 Mahalakshmi Kollapuradamma Temple,Ratnagiri
 Mahalakshmi temple Sulebhavi Belgaum
 Sweta Lakshmi Varahi Temple , Telanagana
 Astabhuja mahalakshmi temple Haldwani
 Shri Kollapuradamma Sri Mahalakshmi temple , Chitradurga
 London Sri Mahalakshmi Temple
 Mahalakshmi temple delaware, United States

Hymns 

Countless hymns, prayers, shlokas, stotra, songs, and legends dedicated to Mahalakshmi are recited during the ritual worship of Lakshmi. These include:

 Sri Mahalakshmi Ashtakam
 Sri Lakshmi Sahasaranama Stotra (by Sanath kumara)
 Sri Stuti (by Sri Vedantha Desikar)
 Sri Lakshmi Stuti (by Indra)
 Sri Kanakadhāra Stotram (by Sri Adi Shankara)
 Sri Chatussloki (by Sri Yamunacharya)
 Sri Lakshmi Sloka (by Bhagavan Sri Hari Swamiji)
 Sri Sukta, which is contained in the Vedas and includes Lakshmi Gayatri Mantra ("Om Shree Mahalakshmyai ca vidmahe Vishnu patnyai ca dheemahi tanno Lakshmi prachodayat, Om")
 Lakshmi Gayatri mantra mentioned in Linga Purana (48.13) - " Sammuddhrtayai vidmahe Vishnunaikena dhimahi | tan no Radha prachodaydt " translated to "we think about Lakshmi whom Vishnu himself supports, we meditate on her, then let Radha inspire us."
 Astalakshmi stotram (By  Sage Vyasa )

Archaeology

A representation of the goddess as Gaja Lakshmi or Lakshmi flanked by two elephants spraying her with water, is one of the most frequently found in archaeological sites. An ancient sculpture of Gaja Lakshmi (from Sonkh site at Mathura) dates to the pre-Kushan Empire era. Atranjikhera site in modern Uttar Pradesh has yielded terracotta plaque with images of Lakshmi dating to 2nd century BCE. Other archaeological sites with ancient Lakshmi terracotta figurines from the 1st millennium BCE include Vaisali, Sravasti, Kausambi, Campa, and Candraketugadh.

The goddess Lakshmi is frequently found in ancient coins of various Hindu kingdoms from Afghanistan to India. Gaja Lakshmi has been found on coins of Scytho-Parthian kings Azes II and Azilises; she also appears on Shunga Empire king Jyesthamitra era coins, both dating to 1st millennium BCE. Coins from 1st through 4th century CE found in various locations in India such as Ayodhya, Mathura, Ujjain, Sanchi, Bodh Gaya, Kanauj, all feature Lakshmi. Similarly, ancient Greco-Indian gems and seals with images of Lakshmi have been found, estimated to be from 1st-millennium BCE.

A 1400-year-old rare granite sculpture of Lakshmi has been recovered at the Waghama village along Jehlum in Anantnag district of Jammu and Kashmir.

The Pompeii Lakshmi, a statuette supposedly thought to be of Lakshmi found in Pompeii, Italy, dates to before the eruption of Vesuvius in 79 CE.

Outside Hinduism

Jainism

Lakshmi is also an important deity in Jainism and found in Jain temples. Some Jain temples also depict Sri Lakshmi as a goddess of artha ('wealth') and kama ('pleasure'). For example, she is exhibited with Vishnu in Parshvanatha Jain Temple at the Khajuraho Monuments of Madhya Pradesh, where she is shown pressed against Vishnu's chest, while Vishnu cups a breast in his palm. The presence of Vishnu-Lakshmi iconography in a Jain temple built near the Hindu temples of Khajuraho, suggests the sharing and acceptance of Lakshmi across a spectrum of Indian religions. This commonality is reflected in the praise of Lakshmi found in the Jain text Kalpa Sūtra.

Buddhism

In Buddhism, Lakshmi has been viewed as a goddess of abundance and fortune, and is represented on the oldest surviving stupas and cave temples of Buddhism. In Buddhist sects of Tibet, Nepal, and Southeast Asia, Vasudhara mirrors the characteristics and attributes of the Hindu Goddess, with minor iconographic differences.

In Chinese Buddhism, Lakshmi is referred to as either Gōngdétiān (功德天, lit "Meritorious god" ) or Jíxiáng Tiānnǚ (吉祥天女, lit "Auspicious goddess") and is the goddess of fortune and prosperity. She is regarded as the sister of Píshāméntiān (毗沙門天), or Vaiśravaṇa, one of the Four Heavenly Kings. She is also regarded as one of the twenty-four protective deities, and her image is frequently enshrined in the Mahavira Hall of most Chinese Buddhist monasteries together with the other deities. Her mantra, the Sri Devi Dharani (Chinese: 大吉祥天女咒; pinyin: Dà Jíxiáng Tiānnǚ Zhòu) is classified as one of the Ten Small Mantras (Chinese: 十小咒; pinyin: Shí xiǎo zhòu), which are a collection of dharanis that are commonly recited in Chinese Buddhist temples during morning liturgical services.

In Japanese Buddhism, Lakshmi is known as Kishijoten and is also the goddess of fortune and prosperity. Like in China, Kishijoten is considered the sister of Bishamon (also known as Tamon or Bishamon-ten), who protects human life, fights evil, and brings good fortune. In ancient and medieval Japan, Kishijoten was the goddess worshiped for luck and prosperity, particularly on behalf of children. Kishijoten was also the guardian goddess of Geishas.

In Tibetan Buddhism, Lakshmi is an important deity, especially in the Gelug School. She has both peaceful and wrathful forms; the latter form is known as Palden Lhamo, Shri Devi Dudsol Dokam, or Kamadhatvishvari, and is the principal female protector of (Gelug) Tibetan Buddhism and of Lhasa, Tibet.

While Lakshmi and Vaiśravaṇa are found in ancient Chinese and Japanese Buddhist literature, their roots have been traced to deities in Hinduism.

Lakshmi is closely linked to Dewi Sri, who is worshipped in Bali as the goddess of fertility and agriculture.

Incarnations
Lakshmi is attributed with various incarnations, including the following:
 Bhumi
 Vedavati 
 Sita
 Radha
 Gopis
 Rukmini
 Jambavati
 Satyabhama
 Kalindi
 Nagnajiti
 Mitravinda
 Lakshmana
 Bhadra
 Junior wives of Krishna
 Revati
 Padmavathi

 Niladevi
 Tulasi

 Kamalatmika
 Ashta Lakshmi
 Andal
Narasimhi
Vaishnavi
Namagiri Thayar
Kolhapur ambabai
Chottanikkara bhagavathy
Vaishno Devi
Kallur Mahalakshmi

Notes

See also 
 Ashta Lakshmi
 Deepalakshmi
 Doddagaddavalli
 Lakshmi Puja
 Hindu goddess
 Varalakshmi Vratam
 Lakshmi Narayana
 Star of Lakshmi
 Tridevi

References

Bibliography

Further reading
  (in Sanskrit only)
 Dilip Kododwala, 
 
 Lakshmi Puja and Thousand Names by Swami Satyananda Saraswati

External links 

British Broadcasting Corporation – Lakshmi
Kashmiri Overseas Association, Inc – Goddess Lakshmi

 
Mother goddesses
Female buddhas and supernatural beings
Fortune goddesses
Beauty goddesses
Hindu goddesses
Shaktism
Commerce goddesses
Consorts of Vishnu
Harvest goddesses
Abundance goddesses
Love and lust goddesses
Peace goddesses
Lion deities